2022 Gulf 12 Hours could refer to the following events:
January 2022 Gulf 12 Hours
December 2022 Gulf 12 Hours